The 2018 Sweden Hockey Games was played between 26 and 29 April 2018. The Czech Republic, Finland, Sweden and Russia played a round-robin for a total of three games per team and six games in total. Three of the matches were played in Stockholm, Sweden, two matches in Södertälje, Sweden and one match in Helsinki, Finland. Finland won the tournament. The tournament was part of 2017–18 Euro Hockey Tour.

Standings

Games

All times are local.
Södertälje and Stockholm– (Central European Summer Time – UTC+2) Helsinki – (Eastern European Summer Time - UTC+3)

References

External links
Sweden Hockey Games

Sweden Hockey Games
Sweden
Sweden
Sweden
Sweden
Sweden
Sweden
Sports competitions in Södertälje
International sports competitions in Helsinki
2010s in Helsinki
2010s in Stockholm
International sports competitions in Stockholm